Hara filamentosa or Erethistes filamentosus is a species of South Asian river catfish found in Myanmar and Thailand. It can be found in the Ataran, Sittang, and Salween River drainages. It occurs in fast-flowing rivers with stony or sandy bottom. This species grows to a length of  SL.

References

Erethistidae
Fish of Myanmar
Fish of Thailand
Fish described in 1860
Taxa named by Edward Blyth